Sorted may refer to:
Sorted (TV series), a BBC television series
"Sorted for E's & Wizz", a 1995 Pulp song
Sorted (The Drones album), 1999
Sorted (DJ? Acucrack album)
Sorted (film), a 2000 British thriller film
Sorted, a men's magazine
Sorted Food,  British YouTube cooking channel and food website

See also 
 Many-sorted logic
 Sort (disambiguation)